
Waña Quta (Aymara waña dry, quta lake, "dry lake", hispanicized spellings Huañakota, Huaña Kota, Huaña Khota, Huaña Kkota, Huayñakota, Huaña Q'ota) is a small lake in Bolivia located in the Oruro Department, Sajama Province. It is in the Sajama National Park northwest of the Sajama volcano at a height of about 4,350 metres (14,270 ft).

The lake is a place to discover birds like Andean avocet, Andean lapwing, cattle egret, horned coot, Puna teal, ruddy duck and yellow-billed pintail.

References 

Lakes of Oruro Department